Tom Parsons (born 1988) is a Gaelic footballer who plays for the east Mayo club Charlestown Sarsfields. He played for the Mayo county team, until his retirement in 2021.

Parsons midfielder of note at the beginning of his county career. He broke onto the Mayo senior team in 2008, giving what was described as an 'inspirational' display against his native Sligo in the Connacht Senior Football Championship semi-final. He also performed well against eventual winners Galway in the Connacht final. Mayo were knocked out of the championship by Tyrone in the last round of the qualifiers.

Parsons also played for the Mayo side that the 2008 All-Ireland Under-21 Football Championship semi-final in 2008.

He was selected as part of the Ireland squad to play in the 2008 International Rules Series against Australia. some speculation that Parsons might consider signing a contract with an Australian Football League club, but he said that he had no interest in playing Australian rules.

Parsons was recalled to the Mayo senior team in 2020, dislocated his knee and ruptured ligaments and torn calf and hamstring in the 2018 Connacht Senior Football Championship match against Galway.
He announced his retirement from inter-county football in January 2021, shortly after his teammates David Clarke and Donal Vaughan.

Honours
 Connacht Senior Football Championship (4): 2009, 2014, 2015, 2020
 Connacht Under-21 Football Championship (3): 2007, 2008, 2009
 Connacht Senior Football Championship (1): 2009
 International Rules (1): 2008

References

1988 births
Living people
Irish international rules football players
Mayo inter-county Gaelic footballers
Sligo Gaelic footballers